

O

See also
Toronto Stock Exchange
List of Canadian companies
S&P/TSX Composite Index

External links
 Toronto Stock Exchange

O